Dr. Beverly Jones House is a historic plantation house located near Bethania, Forsyth County, North Carolina.  It was designed by noted Virginia architect Dabney Cosby (1779-1862) and built in 1846–1847.  It is a two-story, three bay by two bay, Neoclassical style brick dwelling with a two-story rear wing.  Also on the property are the contributing kitchen, smokehouse, and three slave houses.

It was listed on the National Register of Historic Places in 1978.

References

Plantation houses in North Carolina
Houses on the National Register of Historic Places in North Carolina
Neoclassical architecture in North Carolina
Houses completed in 1847
Houses in Forsyth County, North Carolina
National Register of Historic Places in Forsyth County, North Carolina
1847 establishments in North Carolina